Topaquinone (TPQ) is a redox cofactor derived from the amino acid tyrosine. Its name derives from 2,4,5-trihydroxyphenylalanine-quinone. Its structure was first identified in 1990. It is used by copper amine oxidases which contain a tyrosine residue near the active site. This residue catalyses its own transition, first to dopaquinone and then to topaquinone, in a Cu2+ dependent manner.

References 

Cofactors
Amino acid derivatives
1,4-Benzoquinones
Hydroxybenzoquinones
Propionic acids